Aoto Suzuki (鈴木 碧斗, born 30 May 2001) is a Japanese athlete. He competed in the men's 4 × 400 metres relay event at the 2020 Summer Olympics.

References

External links
 

2001 births
Living people
Japanese male sprinters
Athletes (track and field) at the 2020 Summer Olympics
Olympic athletes of Japan
Sportspeople from Saitama (city)
21st-century Japanese people